California is a hamlet to the south side of Aylesbury town centre in Buckinghamshire in England, although today it has been completely swallowed up by the urban growth of Aylesbury.

Etymology
The hamlet is probably named after the U.S. state of California, though its history goes back long before the state was known to British people. The name of the original farm was therefore most likely changed to California at some point  before 1839. It is widely believed that the hamlet was named after visiting American servicemen during the Second World War; however, 19th-century maps prove this to be incorrect.

History
Until the arrival of the Wycombe Railway in Aylesbury in 1863, California was the name of a farm and related buildings that stood in the area.  However, with the arrival of the railway, cottages were constructed in the location of the farm to house railway workers and the area became known as the Hamlet of California.

Hazell, Watson and Viney
In 1867, printing and publishing firm, Hazell, Watson and Viney, opened an inkworks in a disused silk mill in the hamlet. In 1878, this was moved to purpose built premises on the Tring Road (current site of Tesco), which closed in 1952.

20th century
By the early 1920s  Aylesbury had grown such that it was necessary to start building houses on the site of Southcourt (the other side of California from Aylesbury), and so California and the associated farmlands that surrounded it became part of Aylesbury town. Eventually the farmlands themselves were built on, though the railway cottages that formed the hamlet remain.

In 1924, the Bishop of Oxford transferred lands owned in California into the hands of the Municipal Borough of Aylesbury, which in 1929 was partially used in the construction of a new church and parsonage house, which is currently located on Penn Road.

21st century
The site was home to the "California Industrial Estate" until 2005 when it was demolished to make way for a new housing estate, renamed the "Grand Central" due to its proximity to the centre of Aylesbury. As of November 2006 the building work has nearly finished and it is likely that the hamlet will be forgotten as it has been completely swamped by Aylesbury's development.

Facilities

Education
Aylesbury College
Sir Henry Floyd Grammar School
Oak Green School
Bambino Community Nursery
Pebble Brook School

Religion
Southcourt Baptist Church

Other
The Railway Club, a social club
Southcourt Community Centre

References

External links
 Image of California industry c. 1900

Aylesbury
Hamlets in Buckinghamshire